The Egyptian Republic Railways 4211 class was a class of 0-6-0 diesel shunter introduced on Egyptian Republic Railways (now Egyptian National Railways) in the 1950s. Arnold Jung Lokomotivfabrik in Jungenthal, Rheinland-Pfalz, Germany built the first batch of 15 in 1953 and the second batch of 27 in 1955–56.

During the 1956 Israeli invasion of Sinai number 4239 (Jung works number 21646) was captured in Sinai on the former Palestine Railways line between El Kantara East and Gaza. It was taken into Israel Railways and renumbered 251. It was little used and in about 1970 it was scrapped.

References

Sources

0-6-0 locomotives
1953 establishments in Egypt
Railway locomotives introduced in 1953
1950s in transport
Diesel locomotives of Egypt
Diesel locomotives of Israel
Suez Crisis
Arnold Jung locomotives